The Minister Plenipotentiary of the Netherlands Antilles represented the constituent country of the Netherlands Antilles in the Council of Ministers of the Kingdom of the Netherlands. The Minister Plenipotentiary at the 2010 dissolution of the Netherlands Antilles was Marcel van der Plank. The Minister Plenipotentiary and his cabinet were seated in the "Antillenhuis" (Antilles House) in The Hague.

List of Ministers Plenipotentiary of the Netherlands Antilles 
The following table lists the Ministers Plenipotentiary of Netherlands Antilles that have been in office until its dissolution.

References